Aimee Mackin (born 22 April 1997) is an Irish dual code footballer from Camlough in County Armagh. In association football she has played for Women's Premiership clubs Newry City and Sion Swifts, and represented the Northern Ireland women's national football team at both youth and senior level. She also played ladies' Gaelic football for Shane O'Neill's GAC and at senior level for Armagh GAA, competing in the Ladies' National Football League and All-Ireland Senior Ladies' Football Championship. She was named the 2020 TG4 Senior Player's Player of the Year.

Soccer career

Club career
In September 2015, Newry City won the Northern Ireland Women's Premier League, when Mackin scored a dramatic last-minute winner over Mid-Ulster Ladies. Mackin signed for Sion Swifts in March 2018 after Newry City withdrew from the Women's Premiership.

International career

Youth
In 2011 Mackin was called up to represent Northern Ireland at under-15 schoolgirl level while she attended St Paul's High School, Bessbrook. In April 2012 she was a key player in the team which retained the Bob Docherty Cup. By the following season she was participating for the Northern Ireland women's national under-17 football team in their 2013 UEFA Women's Under-17 Championship qualification series.

In February 2015 Mackin scored a hat-trick for the Northern Ireland women's national under-19 football team in a 9–1 win over Estonia at Solitude.

Senior
Mackin made her senior debut for Northern Ireland in October 2013, during the 2015 FIFA Women's World Cup qualification campaign. She was still 16 years old when she scored against Estonia in March 2014.

Gaelic football career
From a prominent Gaelic Athletic Association (GAA) family, Mackin's father Michael served as a coach and chairman of Shane O'Neill's GAC where Aimee and her five siblings all played. Aimee was among four of the siblings to progress to senior inter-county football with Armagh. She made her debut in 2015 and won All Star honours following a series of promising performances. She won another All Star in 2017, before her progress was derailed by an anterior cruciate ligament injury in July 2019.

After a period of rehabilitation Mackin stopped playing soccer to focus on Gaelic football. Exceptional form on her return led to her winning the 2020 TG4 Senior Player's Player of the Year.

Personal life
Mackin attended St Paul's High School, Bessbrook and Ulster University at Jordanstown.

In 2022 Mackin's sister and Armagh team-mate Bláithín signed for AFL Women's club Melbourne Football Club, but Aimee decided to remain in Ireland: "I'm probably a bit of a homebird so playing Gaelic is the priority for me at the minute." At the time she was employed as a classroom assistant at her alma mater St Paul's High School.

References

External links

Profile at Irish Football Association (IFA)

1997 births
Living people
Women's association footballers from Northern Ireland
Northern Ireland women's international footballers
Sion Swifts Ladies F.C. players
Ladies' Gaelic footballers who switched code
Women's association football forwards
Women's Premiership (Northern Ireland) players
Sportspeople from Newry
Armagh ladies' Gaelic footballers
People educated at St Paul's High School, Bessbrook
Educators from Northern Ireland
Alumni of Ulster University
21st-century educators from Northern Ireland
Newry City Ladies F.C. players